List of all episodes of the VH1 reality television series Celebrity Rehab with Dr. Drew:

Season 1: 2008

Season 2: 2008

Season 3: 2010

Season 4: 2010–2011

Season 5: 2011

Season 6: 2012

See also
Celebrity Rehab with Dr. Drew
Sober House
Sex Rehab with Dr. Drew

References

External links
Official site at VH1.com

Lists of American non-fiction television series episodes
Lists of reality television series episodes